Sasi (Akkadian: Sāsî) or Sasija (Sāsīja) was a usurper in the Neo-Assyrian Empire who conspired to seize the throne from Esarhaddon in 671–670 BC. Little is known of his background but he was presumably descended from an earlier Assyrian king, perhaps Sargon II ( BC). Sasi was proclaimed king in Harran by a prophetess (the oracle of Nusku) and rapidly gained support throughout the empire before he was defeated and presumably killed in 670 BC. Esarhaddon had large numbers of magnates and officials who had supported Sasi executed.

Origin 
Very little is known of Sasi's background. His name was relatively common in Assyria and may have been an abbreviation for a longer name. Sasi was presumably a high official before the conspiracy. Surviving documents suggest that Sasi served as a city mayor, perhaps of Harran, and that he at one point worked in Esarhaddon's royal library.

He was likely of Assyrian royal descent since it is unlikely that he would otherwise be considered a serious contender for the throne. Since the prophecy concerning his rise to power mentions the destruction of the "seed of Sennacherib" (Esarhaddon's father) he was probably not descended from Sennacherib but he could have been descended from Sennacherib's father Sargon II. It is also possible that the prophecy referred to the downfall of the entire Sargonid dynasty, in which case Sasi would have to be descended from even earlier kings.

Conspiracy 
In 671 BC, shortly after Esarhaddon had conquered Egypt, a prophetess from Harran claimed to have received a divine message from the god Nusku and proclaimed Sasi as the king of Assyria, ecstatically uttering the prophecy "This is the word of the god Nusku: Kingship belongs to Sasi. I shall destroy the name and the seed of Sennacherib!". The prophecy was a great threat to Esarhaddon's rule since his successful conquest of Egypt had also been foretold in another prophecy from Harran, demonstrating the trustworthiness of prophecies originating in the city.

Sasi was at Harran at the time the prophecy was uttered. In a very short period of time, he was able to win over many followers from all over the empire to his cause, probably owing to the personal charisma of the prophetess who had proclaimed him king. Some of his prominent supporters were very high up in the imperial hierarchy, such as Ashur-nasir, Esarhaddon's chief eunuch. Loyalty oaths were sworn by nobles and prominent individuals to Sasi as if he were already king.

Esarhaddon was made aware of the conspiracy shortly after Sasi was proclaimed king and kept careful watch over the pretender's actions and his increasing support not only around Harran (where support was particularly strong) but also in central Assyria and in Babylonia. The conspirators, believing that Sasi had been chosen by the gods and was thus divinely protected, made little effort to conceal their plans and actions. Despite this, Sasi is recorded to have sent some letters to Esarhaddon during the conspiracy. After the court official Nabu-ushallim wrote a letter to Esarhaddon concerning Sasi's conspiracy, Sasi responded by sending a letter of his own to Esarhaddon claiming that he was loyal to the king and that Nabu-ushallim was the true traitor.

Little is known of how the conspiracy was ultimately handled but by 670 BC Sasi was no longer a threat and Esarhaddon is recorded to have executed many of his magnates and officials, presumably in connection to their support for Sasi. Unless they were able to escape abroad, Sasi and the prophetess who had proclaimed him were presumably also captured and executed at this time.

References 

7th-century BC Assyrian kings
670s BC deaths
Year of birth unknown
Usurpers